Béla Ervin Graf und Freiherr von Bothmer zu Schwegerhoff (14 October 1857 - 26 December 1940) was a Hungarian military officer. He was born in the village of Szőlősardó, in the Hungarian county of Borsod-Abaúj-Zemplén, as one of the six children of Carl Alexander Friedrich and Rosa von Szabó de Sepsi-Szent-György.

Army career
He served as in the Austro-Hungarian Army as a cadet-Wachtmeister, lieutenant and first lieutenant in the 5th k.u.k. Uhlanen Regiment. He was then transferred to the Royal Hungarian Honvéd-Kavallerie, earning the rank of Rittmeister on 1 November 1889, then to Major on 1 November 1897, and on 1 May 1901 he was made a Lt.-Colonel. In 1903 he was appointed as commander of the 8th Honvéd-Hussars Regiment and then later was transferred in 1907 as a regiment commander of the 10th Honvéd-Hussars Regiment. His younger brother, Arpád Albert Rudolf, became the Field Marshal of the Royal Hungarian Army.

Marriages 
Béla Ervin married Mariska Jankovich de Jeszenicze in Rácz-Almás on 20 June 1885 and married his second wife, Martha Szontagh de Igló, in Budapest on 20 September 1898. Both marriages were childless.

Death 
He died in Halmi on 26 December 1940, aged 83.

References 
 Die Familie von Bothmer by Dr. Hermann von Bothmer
 Der Oesterreichische-Kaiserliche Orden Der Eisernen Krone und Seine Mitglieder - Wien 1912

Austro-Hungarian Army officers
Hungarian military personnel
Hungarian nobility
People from Borsod-Abaúj-Zemplén County
1857 births
1940 deaths